The 2018 All-Ireland Minor Football Championship was the GAA's premier inter-county gaelic football competition for under 17s. Thirty one county teams from Ireland competed (Kilkenny did not participate).

2018 was the first minor competition for under 17 year-olds – previously the competition had an under 18 age limit. The under 17 championship with a new format was introduced after a vote at the GAA congress on 26 February 2016.

A league format was introduced in Connacht and Leinster. Munster retained their double elimination format and Ulster changed to a double elimination format.

Kerry defeated Galway by 0-21 to 1-14 on 2 September 2018 to win their fifth All-Ireland minor title in a row, the first time this feat was achieved.

The winners received the Tom Markham Cup.

Teams
Thirty one teams from Ireland contested the championship as Kilkenny withdrew after competing in 2016. New York and London did not participate in this competition.

Competition format

Provincial Championships

Connacht, Leinster, Munster and Ulster each organised provincial championships. Each province decided their own rules for determining their champions. The formats for the 2018 provincial championships are explained in the sections below.

All-Ireland

The four provincial winners play the four provincial runners-up in the All-Ireland quarter-finals. Two semi-finals and a final follow. All matches are played in a single knockout format. The minor final is normally played before the All-Ireland senior final.

Provincial championships

Connacht Minor Football Championship

Connacht Format

All five Connacht counties compete in a single round-robin format. The top 2 teams in the round robin table meet again in the Connacht final.

The winners receive the Tom Kilcoyne Cup.

Connacht Table

Connacht League Section Rounds 1 to 5

Connacht Final

Leinster Minor Football Championship

Leinster Format

Leinster teams competed in two groups, one of six teams and one of five teams. Each team in a group plays a single match against the other teams.  The first two teams in each group progress to the Leinster semi-finals.

Leinster Group 1 Table

Leinster Group 1 Rounds 1 to 5

Leinster Group 2 Table

{| class="wikitable" style="text-align:center"
!width=20|
!width=150 style="text-align:left;"|Team
!width=20|
!width=20|
!width=20|
!width=20|
!width=30|
!width=30|
!width=20|
!width=20|
|- bgcolor="#ccffcc" 
|1||align=left|  Wexford ||1||1||0||0||1-0||1-0||1||2
|- bgcolor="#ffffcc"
|2||align=left| Kildare ||1||1||0||0||1-0||1-0||1||2
|- 
|3||align=left| Carlow ||1||1||0||0||1-0||1-0||1||2
|- 
|4||align=left| Laois ||1||1||0||0||1-0||1-0||1||2
|- 
|5||align=left| Longford ||1||1||0||0||1-0||1-0||1||2
|- 

|}

Leinster Group 2 Rounds 1 to 5

Leinster Semi-Finals

Leinster Final

Munster Minor Football Championship

Munster Format

All six Munster teams competed in the three quarter-finals of the main draw. The three beaten teams entered the play-off section and, after two play-off matches, one team re-entered the main draw at the semi-final stage. From the semi-finals all matches were knockout.

Munster Main Draw

Munster Playoff Draw

The three teams who were beaten in the quarter-finals of the main draw competed in a play-off in two matches. The winning team from the play-offs re-entered the main draw at the semi-final stage.

Munster Quarter-Finals

Munster Playoff Rounds 1 and 2

Munster Semi-Finals

Munster Final

Ulster Minor Football Championship

Ulster Format

In 2018 the Ulster Championship changed to a double-elimination format, which replaced the straight knockout style of previous years. Every team who lost a match before the semi-finals re-entered the competition via the Qualifiers Round 1 (R1), Qualifiers Round 2 (R2) or Qualifiers Round 3 (R3). This ensured that all teams played at least two games. The semi-finals and final were knockout.

The winners received the Father Murray Cup.

Ulster Direct Route

Ulster Preliminary Round

Two of the nine teams were drawn to play in the preliminary round.

Ulster Round 1

The seven teams who avoided the preliminary round plus the winners of the preliminary round competed in four matches in round 1.

Ulster Round 2

The four winning teams from round 1 met in two matches.

Ulster Qualifier Route

Ulster Qualifiers R1

Two of the five teams beaten in the preliminary round or round 1 met in a playoff match. The losing team was eliminated from the competition.

Ulster Qualifiers R2

The four remaining teams who lost only one match in the preliminary round or round 1 met in two matches with the two losing teams being eliminated,

Ulster Qualifiers R3

The two losing teams from round 2 (who lost only one match) met the two winning teams from the qualifiers R2. The two losing teams were eliminated from the competition.

Ulster Knockout Stage

Ulster Semi-Finals

The two winning teams from round 2 met the two winning teams from the qualifiers R3. The two losing teams were eliminated from the competition.

Ulster Final

All-Ireland

All-Ireland Draw

Quarter-finals

The four provincial champions played the four beaten finalists from the provincial championships.

Semi-finals

There was no draw for the semi-finals as the fixtures are pre-determined on a three yearly rotation. This rotation ensures that a provinces's champions play the champions of all the other provinces once every three years in the semi-finals, if they each win their quarter-finals. If a provincial winner loses their quarter final, then the provincial runner-up who beat them take their place in the semi-final.

Final

Minor Team Of The Year
1. John Ball (Kildare)
2. Ronan Grimes (Monaghan)
3. Owen Fitzgerald (Kerry)
4. Tiarnan Woods (Derry)
5. Colm Moriarty (Kerry)
6. Tony Gill (Galway)
7. Mark Lavin (Dublin)
8. Darragh Rahilly (Kerry)
9. Conor Raftery (Galway)
10. Paul Walsh (Kerry)
11. Matthew Costello (Meath)
12. Aaron Mulligan (Monaghan)
13. Luke Mitchell (Meath)
14. Eoin Darcy (Wicklow)
15. Matthew Cooley (Galway)

See also
 2018 All-Ireland Senior Football Championship
 2018 All-Ireland Under-20 Football Championship

References

All-Ireland Minor Football Championship
All-Ireland Minor Football Championship